Yoshifumi Nakajima (born September 25, 1990), nicknamed Gottsu,  is a Japanese professional basketball player who plays for the Passlab Yamagata Wyverns of the B.League in Japan.
He was selected by the Akita Northern Happinets with the second overall pick in the 2014 bj League draft.

Career statistics

Regular season 

|-
| align="left" | 2013-14
| align="left" | Wakayama
| 9 || 0 || 3.0 || .333 || .000 || .333 || 0.6 || 0.1 || 0.3|| 0.1 ||  1.1
|-
| align="left" | 2014-15
| align="left" | Akita
| 17 ||  || 5.2 || .432 || .286 || .500 || 0.9 || 0.6 || 0.1 || 0 ||  2.2
|-
| align="left" | 2015-16
| align="left" | Aomori
| 44|| ||9.3 ||.384 ||.306 ||.900 ||1.3 ||0.6 ||0.3 ||0.0 ||2.4
|-
| align="left" | 2016-17
| align="left" | Ehime
| 60||48 ||23.5 ||.479 ||.368 ||.742 ||3.6 ||1.3 ||0.8 ||0.0 ||7.4
|-
| align="left" | 2017-18
| align="left" | Yamagata
| 60||53 ||26.5 ||.359 ||.286 ||.814 ||3.0 ||2.6 ||0.8 ||0.1 ||7.2
|-
| align="left" | 2018-19
| align="left" | Yamagata
| 57||55 ||31.29 ||.427 ||.342 ||.724 ||3.2 ||4.9 ||0.7 ||0.0 ||11.9
|-
| align="left" | 2019-20
| align="left" | Yamagata
| 47||39 ||25.9 ||.378 ||.309 ||.763 ||2.6 ||3.1 ||0.5 ||0.0 ||6.9
|-

Playoffs 

|-
|style="text-align:left;"|2015-16
|style="text-align:left;"|Aomori
| 2 ||   ||13.50  || .286   || .143 || 1.000 ||0.5 ||0.0 || 1.0|| 0 ||7.5
|-

Early cup games 

|-
|style="text-align:left;"|2017
|style="text-align:left;"|Yamagata
| 2 || 1 || 28.06 || .333 || .250 || .333 || 2.5 || 4.0 || 1.5 || 0.5 || 6.5
|-

Gallery

References

1990 births
Living people
Akita Northern Happinets players
Aomori Wat's players
Ehime Orange Vikings players
Japanese men's basketball players
Passlab Yamagata Wyverns players
Sportspeople from Kōchi Prefecture
Wakayama Trians players
Point guards